Pamela Behr (born September 21, 1956 in Hindelang, then West Germany) is a retired German alpine ski racer. She is the second youngest person ever to win an FIS Alpine Ski World Cup race, winning a slalom in Val d'Isere, France, in December 1972 at the age of 16 years, 79 days. It would be the only World Cup race win of her ten-year career. She won the silver medal in slalom at the FIS Alpine World Ski Championships 1978 in Garmisch-Partenkirchen.

Skiing career
Behr made her debut on the World Cup circuit at the age of 14 in the 1971 season and scored her first World Cup points the next year, with three top-ten results during the 1972 season. These included second place in a slalom in Pra-Loup, France, in March 1972 at the age of 15 years, 178 days, the youngest ever to finish on a World Cup podium (top three).

She competed in three Winter Olympics, racing in all alpine skiing events during her Olympic debut in 1972 at age 15, finishing 6th in slalom, 25th in giant slalom, and 36th in downhill. She would place 5th in slalom at the 1976 Olympics, but failed to finish the slalom in her final Olympics in 1980.

Behr won the West German national championships a total of seven times between 1971 and 1979, six times in slalom and once in giant slalom.

World Cup podiums

World Championships medals

Personal life
Pamela Behr is the daughter of Sepp Behr, an alpine ski racer who also won seven West German national championships titles in slalom, giant slalom, and combined from 1954 to 1962. She is married to Christian Knauth, the marketing and communications director of the FIS (International Ski Federation).

References

External links
 
 

German female alpine skiers
Olympic alpine skiers of West Germany
Alpine skiers at the 1972 Winter Olympics
Alpine skiers at the 1976 Winter Olympics
Alpine skiers at the 1980 Winter Olympics
1956 births
Living people
People from Oberallgäu
Sportspeople from Swabia (Bavaria)
20th-century German women